Staš Skube (born 15 November 1989) is a Slovenian handball player who plays for Montpellier Handball and the Slovenian national team.

His older brother is Sebastian Skube.

Career
Skube started his career in 2006 with RK Trimo Trebnje. In 2013, he moved to RK Gorenje Velenje. After three seasons, he transferred to SC Pick Szeged. In June 2018, Skube joined RK Vardar.

References

1989 births
Living people
Sportspeople from Novo Mesto
Slovenian male handball players
Expatriate handball players
SC Pick Szeged players
RK Vardar players
Montpellier Handball players
Slovenian expatriate sportspeople in Hungary
Slovenian expatriate sportspeople in North Macedonia
Slovenian expatriate sportspeople in Belarus
Slovenian expatriate sportspeople in France
21st-century Slovenian people